Tariffville is a neighborhood and census-designated place (CDP) in the town of Simsbury in Hartford County, Connecticut, United States. The population was 1,324 at the 2010 census. It is a popular location for whitewater paddlers who use the Farmington River.

Part of the original mill village area is included in the Tariffville Historic District, listed on the National Register of Historic Places. The historic district excludes newer development around West Point Terrace and Hayes Road, as well as properties along White Water Turn, Wooster Road, and Main Street Extension. The historic district is architecturally significant for preserving some evidence of early nineteenth-century mill village characteristics (in retaining some old mill housing and street layout) and for also preserving later 19th-century Greek Revival and Gothic Revival structures.

Geography
Tariffville is in the northeast corner of the town of Simsbury, on the inside of a sharp bend in the Farmington River. The northeast and northwest borders of the CDP follow the river, with the northeast part also forming the town line with East Granby. The southeast border of the CDP follows the crest of Talcott Mountain and is the town line with Bloomfield. The southern border of the CDP follows a line just south of West Point Terrace from Talcott Mountain back down to the river.

Connecticut Route 189 (Hartford Avenue) runs through the east end of Tariffville, leading north  to Granby and south  to Hartford. Connecticut Route 315 passes through the center of Tariffville as Elm Street and Tariffville Road.

History
In 1825 (or 1827), the Tariff Manufacturing Company built a carpet mill along the Farmington River, giving its name to the area. The company name came from the Tariff Act of 1824 which included protective tariffs for a number of products, including wool and cotton textiles. The area did not have sufficient housing for the workers, so the company built housing, some of which survives today. The carpet business survived for a few decades, but by 1867, the primary industry in the area was sorting and packing of tobacco. The tobacco business would continue as the chief industry through the 1930s. The town was the site of a major rail accident, the Tariffville train crash, in 1878.

The first steel manufacturing plant in the country was established in Tariffville at a site on the Farmington River in 1727.

Demographics

As of the census of 2000, there were 1,371 people, 618 households, and 376 families residing in the CDP. The racial makeup of the CDP was 92.41% White, 2.70% African American, 0.29% Native American, 2.04% Asian, 0.29% from other races, and 2.26% from two or more races. Hispanic or Latino of any race were 1.02% of the population.

There were 618 households, out of which 29.6% had children under the age of 18 living with them, 46.1% were married couples living together, 11.5% had a female householder with no husband present, and 39.0% were non-families. 33.2% of all households were made up of individuals, and 9.5% had someone living alone who was 65 years of age or older.  The average household size was 2.22 and the average family size was 2.87.

In the CDP, the population was spread out, with 23.3% under the age of 18, 5.7% from 18 to 24, 35.1% from 25 to 44, 23.9% from 45 to 64, and 12.0% who were 65 years of age or older.  The median age was 38 years. For every 100 females, there were 95.3 males.  For every 100 females age 18 and over, there were 86.9 males.

The median income for a household in the CDP was $60,000, and the median income for a family was $65,096. Males had a median income of $42,750 versus $32,132 for females. The per capita income for the CDP was $27,585.  About 5.3% of families and 9.5% of the population were below the poverty line, including 13.6% of those under age 18 and 16.0% of those age 65 or over.

References

Census-designated places in Hartford County, Connecticut
Neighborhoods in Connecticut
Simsbury, Connecticut
Census-designated places in Connecticut